Hesar-e Sofla (also Romanized as Ḩeşār-e Soflá and Hesar Sofla; also known as Hesār, Ḩeşār-e Pā’īn, and Hīsār Pāīn) is a village in Shivanat Rural District, Afshar District, Khodabandeh County, Zanjan Province, Iran. At the 2006 census, its population was 234, in 58 families.

References 

Populated places in Khodabandeh County